Malaysian Defence Intelligence Organisation is the military intelligence agency of Malaysia Armed Forces. Its role is said to be equivalent to the US Defense Intelligence Agency. MDIO is headed by an army lieutenant general and consists of tri services military branch such as army intelligence, naval intelligence and air force intelligence.

MDIO was officially formed on 1 October 1981 as Defense Intelligence Staff Division (DISD) to replace the Joint Intelligence Directorate (JID) and the main role of the MDIO at that time was to gather and produce intelligence products to deal with the threat of the Communist Party of Malaya (CPM) during the Second Malayan Emergency.

The head of MDIO is known as Director General and reporting directly to Chief of Armed Forces. It also reports to the Minister of Defence and the National Security Division. The current director is Lt. Gen. Dato' Paduka Abdul Hadi Haji Hussin.

The Defense Intelligence Staff Division (DISD) now known as the Malaysian Defense Intelligence Organization (MDIO) was established with the expansion and restructuring of the organization. 

The Armed Forces Defence Intelligence Staff Division (DISD) has been renamed as the Malaysian Defence Intelligence Organisation (MDIO). The name and logo change were officially done on 23 September 2022 by Chief of Defence Forces General Affendi Buang.

Notes and references

Federal ministries, departments and agencies of Malaysia
Ministry of Defence (Malaysia)
Military intelligence agencies
Malaysian intelligence agencies
Military of Malaysia